Liliyo (also spelled Liliy) is a town in south-western Ivory Coast. It is a sub-prefecture of Soubré Department in Nawa Region, Bas-Sassandra District.

Liliyo was a commune until March 2012, when it became one of 1126 communes nationwide that were abolished.

In 2014, the population of the sub-prefecture of Liliyo was 76,682.

Villages
The seventeen villages of the sub-prefecture of Liliyo and their population in 2014 are:

References

Sub-prefectures of Nawa Region
Former communes of Ivory Coast